Majid Farahani is an Iranian reformist politician who is member of the City Council of Tehran. Farahani was formerly secretary general of the NEDA Party and head of Islamic Iran Participation Front's youth wing.

References

Living people
NEDA Party politicians
Islamic Iran Participation Front politicians
Secretaries-General of political parties in Iran
Office for Strengthening Unity members
Heads of youth wings of political parties in Iran
Tehran Councillors 2017–
Year of birth missing (living people)